Uppiliapuram (also spelt as Uppiliyapuram) is a panchayat town in Tiruchirappalli district in the Indian state of Tamil Nadu.

Geography

Demographics
 India census, Uppiliapuram had a population of 6697. Males constitute 50% of the population and females 50%. Uppiliapuram has an average literacy rate of 65%, higher than the national average of 59.5%: male literacy is 74%, and female literacy is 55%. In Uppiliapuram, 10% of the population is under 6 years of age.

Politics
Uppiliapuram assembly constituency (ST) is part of Perambalur (Lok Sabha constituency).

References

Villages in Tiruchirappalli district